Lygophis flavifrenatus, the fronted ground snake, is a species of snake in the family Colubridae.  The species is native to Brazil, Uruguay, Paraguay, and Argentina.

References

Lygophis
Snakes of South America
Reptiles of Brazil
Reptiles of Uruguay
Reptiles of Paraguay
Reptiles of Argentina
Reptiles described in 1862
Taxa named by Edward Drinker Cope